AEK Kakopetrias was a Cypriot football club based in Kakopetria. Founded in 1956, was playing sometimes in Second, in Third and in Fourth Division.

Honours
 Cypriot Fourth Division:
 Champions (2): 1991, 1994

References

Defunct football clubs in Cyprus
Association football clubs established in 1984
1984 establishments in Cyprus